Koreanosaurus is a genus of orodromine neornithischian dinosaur. One species has been described, Koreanosaurus boseongensis.

Discovery

In 2003, three specimens of Koreanosaurus were found in the Late Cretaceous-age Seonso Conglomerate from the southern coast of the Bibong-ri dinosaur egg site, Boseong, Korean Peninsula. These specimens include the holotype KDRC-BB2, a partial upper skeleton lacking the skull, and two additional specimens which contains portions of the pelvic girdle and lower leg (KDRC-BB1 and KDRC-BB3). The type species was named after its locality (Boseong site 5). This taxon was initially named and described in a master's thesis by Dae-Gil Lee in 2008, and was officially published by Min Huh, Dae-Gil Lee, Jung-Kyun Kim, Jong-Deock Lim and Pascal Godefroit in 2011.

Description 
Koreanosaurus was a relatively small dinosaur, reaching  in body length. Based on its taxonomic position and the existence of small burrows from the Seonso Conglomerate, Koreanosaurus is likely a burrowing dinosaur. Unlike its orodromine relatives, Koreanosaurus is assumed to have been a quadruped.

Classification

Koreanosaurus was considered to be a basal member of the Ornithopoda by the authors, forming a clade with Zephyrosaurus schaffi, Orodromeus makelai and Oryctodromeus cubicularis from which they deduced a burrowing lifestyle. Han et al. found it plausible that Koreanosaurus might be a member of Jeholosauridae or closely related to it.

References 

Ornithischian genera
Campanian life
Santonian life
Late Cretaceous dinosaurs of Asia
 
Fossil taxa described in 2011